New Blood may refer to:

Film and television
New Blood (film), a 1999 British-Canadian film
Friday the 13th Part VII: The New Blood, a 1988 film
New Blood (TV series), a 2016 British drama
"New Blood" (Teenage Mutant Ninja Turtles), a 2005 television episode
"New Blood" (Walking with Dinosaurs), a 1999 television episode
Dexter: New Blood, a 2021 American crime drama mystery miniseries

Music

Albums
New Blood (Blood, Sweat & Tears album), 1972
New Blood (Peter Gabriel album), 2011
New Blood (Yellow Claw album), 2018
New Blood, by the Other, 2010

Songs
"New Blood", by Bloc Party from Hymns, 2016
"New Blood", by Gehenna from WW, 2005
"New Blood", by Pinhead Gunpowder from Pinhead Gunpowder, 2000
"New Blood", by Robert Cray from Strong Persuader, 1986
"New Blood", by Screen 3, 1981
"New Blood", by Their / They're / There, 2013
"New Blood", by Vice Squad from Shot Away, 1984

Other uses
 New Blood (book), a 1999 poetry anthology
 New Blood Interactive, a video game publisher
 The New Blood (professional wrestling), a 2000 WCW wrestling stable
 Trauma Center: New Blood, a 2007 video game